Prairie River is a hamlet in the Canadian province of Saskatchewan.

The former Prairie River railway station is now used to house the Prairie River Museum. The hamlet sits on an inactive Canadian National Railway line that was built and originally operated by the Canadian Northern Railway. Prairie River was also the junction for the Shaw Logging Railroad, which transported wood for the mills in the area.

The location is 1510 ft (460 meters) above sea level, and is located in the Central Standard time zone, or CST. It does not observe daylight saving time.  The telephone area codes for the area are (306) and (639).

Memorable people include Bob Poley, a former CFL Saskatchewan Roughriders player (57).

Demographics 

References

Designated places in Saskatchewan
Organized hamlets in Saskatchewan
Porcupine No. 395, Saskatchewan